Pedro Antonio de Cevallos Cortés y Calderón, also spelled Ceballos (29 June 1715 – 26 December 1778), was a Spanish military Governor of Buenos Aires between 1757 and 1766, and the first Viceroy of the Río de la Plata in 1776.

Biography
Pedro Antonio de Cevallos was born in Cádiz, and came from a renowned Cantabrian family.

He is best remembered for conquering the Colonia de Sacramento twice : in his first expedition in 1762–1763 during and in the aftermath of the defeated Spanish invasion of Portugal (1762), and in his second expedition in 1776–1777 during the Spanish–Portuguese War, 1776–1777.

On 12 October 1776 he sailed with an army from Cadiz, and spent the Southern Hemisphere summer in Buenos Aires, where he had been appointed Viceroy. On 22 April 1777 he landed in Montevideo with a force of 9316 men. He then marched to Colonia del Sacramento, a disputed Portuguese city in present-day Uruguay, which surrendered almost immediately. He then marched towards Rio Grande do Sul in Brazil, conquered Santa Catarina island, but received word from a treaty having been signed between Spain and Portugal and turned back.

He then returned to Buenos Aires where he reassumed the post of Viceroy on 15 October 1777. He introduced the Law of free Commerce of 1778, which allowed Buenos Aires to trade directly with Spain, instead of being forced to trade by way of the Viceroyalty of Peru. He also forbid to move silver out of the limits of the Viceroyalty. This law gave a boost to the development of Buenos Aires. He promoted agriculture and the commerce of slaves.

He died on 26 December 1778 in the Capuchin Convent of Córdoba (Spain), where he was staying on his way to the Spanish Court. He was buried in the Cordoba Cathedral in a sumptuous ceremony, a memorable event in the city's history.

He was married to María Luisa Pinto y Ortega. His son Pedro Antonio de Ceballos Pinto was Agriculture Minister of Argentine general Martín Miguel de Güemes when he was governor of Salta. His sister Antonia de Cevallos Cortés Hoyos y Calderón received from King Charles III after his death the title of "Marchioness de la Colonia".

Bibliography

External links
 Pedro de Cevallos (1715-1778) 

1715 births
1778 deaths
Politicians from Cádiz
Viceroys of the Río de la Plata
18th-century Argentine people
Governors of the Río de la Plata
Spanish captain generals